MultiCultural Aotearoa (MCA) is an anti-fascist group that was formed in 2004 in response to racist attacks in the New Zealand capital, Wellington.

Its main policies are to: 

Oppose the actions of the New Zealand National Front (NZNF)
Oppose humiliating immigration policies
Stop Māori-bashing

On 23 October 2004, the MCA led an anti-racism march from Te Papa to the steps of Parliament to protest an NZNF demonstration. The NZNF had originally planned to demonstrate against Asian immigration, but after the MCA march was organised the topic was changed to support for the New Zealand flag. 

Estimates of attendance at the MCA march vary widely: the national television networks estimated 300, the NZ Herald estimated 800, and the MCA itself claimed 3,000. It included anarchists and members of the International Socialist Organization, among other supporters. 

A scuffle broke out when the "Anarcho Faeries" (about 15 people dressed in costumes including a pink tutu) chanted at the NZNF and were joined by MCA marchers and bystanders. Eventually the National Front protestors left Parliament grounds followed by a small group of Faeries, a few others and most of the police and journalists.

External links 

 
NZ Herald:Three arrests, police officer hurt after National Front march
Scoop Images: Multicultural Aotearoa In Wellington Photos of march
Scoop: Statement from Multicultural Aotearoa
TVNZ:Violent clashes at anti-racism rally
Press releases related to October 2004 march:
March Against Racism Forces Backdown 6 October 2004
Alliance Supports Anti-Racism March 23 October 2004
A Backgrounder On Today's Anti-Racism March 23 October 2004
"Fairies Fighting Fascists" Anarcho-Faerie Collective 25 October 2004
Multicultural Aotearoa Says 3000+ Marched 26 October 2004

2004 establishments in New Zealand
Anti-fascist organizations
Anti-racism in New Zealand
Anti-racist organizations in Oceania
Political organisations based in New Zealand
Māori politics
Organizations established in 2004